The canton of Vallon is an administrative division of the Aveyron department, southern France. It was created at the French canton reorganisation which came into effect in March 2015. Its seat is in Salles-la-Source.

It consists of the following communes:
 
Clairvaux-d'Aveyron
Druelle Balsac
Marcillac-Vallon
Mouret
Muret-le-Château
Nauviale
Pruines
Saint-Christophe-Vallon
Salles-la-Source
Valady

References

Cantons of Aveyron